South Main is an area of Vancouver that centers on Main Street.

South Main may also refer to:
 South Main Arts District, Memphis, Tennessee, United States
 South Main, Houston, Texas, United States
 South Main Baptist Church, a Baptist church in Houston, Texas

See also
 East Main
 North Main
 West Main (disambiguation)